The Archdiocese of Cebu (more formally the Archdiocese of the Most Holy Name of Jesus in Cebu; ; ;) is a Roman Rite archdiocese of the Catholic Church in the Philippines and one of the ecclesiastical provinces of the Catholic Church in the country. It is composed of the entire civil province of Cebu (Cebu and the nearby islands of Mactan, Bantayan, and Camotes). It is the Mother Church of the Philippines. The jurisdiction, Cebu, is considered as the fount of Christianity in the Far East.

The seat of the archdiocese is the Metropolitan Cathedral and Parish of Saint Vitalis and of the Immaculate Conception, more commonly known as the Cebu Metropolitan Cathedral. The archdiocese honors Our Lady of Guadalupe de Cebú as its patroness, St. Vitalis of Milan as its patron and titular, while the second Filipino saint Pedro Calungsod as its secondary patron saint. The current archbishop is the Most Reverend José Serofia Palma, DD, STh.D, who was installed on January 13, 2011. As of 2013, the archdiocese registered a total of 4,609,590 baptized Catholics. It is currently the largest archdiocese in the Philippines and in Asia having the most Catholics, seminarians and priests.

Ecclesiastical Province 
Its Ecclesiastical province comprises the Metropolitan's own Archbishopric and the following Suffragan sees :
 Diocese of Dumaguete, in Negros Oriental and Siquijor
 Diocese of Maasin, in Southern Leyte
 Diocese of Tagbilaran, in southwestern Bohol
 Diocese of Talibon, in northeastern Bohol

History

Antecedents 
The history of the future Archdiocese of Cebu began with the arrival of Ferdinand Magellan in Cebu in 1521. The Church anchored in that year by the native Cebuanos' profession of faith in Christ, baptism, the daily celebration of the Mass, and the chaplain of the expedition, Fr. Pedro Valderrama being the legitimate pastor for their spiritual needs. However, immediately after its inception during the aftermath of Battle of Mactan, the Church of Cebu experienced decadence due to lack of shepherds to enforce and edify the natives on the faith. Most of the natives materially apostatized, while others clung unto the image of the Santo Niño (the first Christian icon in the Philippines given as a baptismal gift by Magellan). The unintended negligence lasted for 44 years until it was re-established in 1565 by the arrival of Miguel López de Legazpi and Fray Andrés de Urdaneta. The remnant of the Cebuano Church in 1521, as evident in the person of Rajah Tupas, was resuscitated by the Augustinians as an Abbey nullius (an equivalent of a diocese) when the formal evangelization of the Philippines commenced with Fr. Urdaneta as the first prelate. The oversight of the natives was then succeeded to Fray Diego de Herrera who would later re-baptized Tupas and his servants in 1568. Adelantado Miguel Lopez de Legazpi established his government in Cebu, thus the first capital of the Philippines.

The Church of Panay
The Church expanded from Cebu when the remaining missionaries led by Fr. Diego de Herrera when they were forced northwest temporarily due to conflict with the Portuguese and laid the foundations of the Christian community in the Panay in around 1569.
The Church of Camarines
In 1570 the second batch of missionaries reached Cebu. The island became the ecclesiastical "seat" as it was the center for evangelization. A notable missionary was Fr. Alfonso Jimenez, O.S.A., who travelled and penetrated the Camarines region through the islands of Masbate, Leyte, Samar, and Burias and founded the Church there. He was called the first apostle of the region.

The Church of Manila
By 1571, Fr. Herrera who was assigned as chaplain of Legazpi, from Panay advanced further north and founded the local Church community in Manila. There, Legazpi transferred the seat of government though Cebu remained the spiritual capital of the country.

The Church of Ilocos-Cagayan
In 1572 the Spaniards led by Juan de Salcedo marched from Manila further north with the second batch of Augustinian missionaries and pioneered the evangelization to the communities in the Ilocos (starting with Vigan) and the Cagayan regions.

Diocese of Cebu 
On February 6, 1579, the Philippines' first diocese, the Diocese of Manila, had been established as a suffragan of the See of Mexico. On August 14, 1595, Pope Clement VIII issued four bulls to Spain: one with the incipit Super universas orbis ecclesias elevating the See of Manila to metropolitan status; and three with the incipit Super specula militantis Ecclesiae erecting the three suffragan dioceses of Manila, which were the Diocese of Cebu, the Diocese of Nueva Cáceres, and the Diocese of Nueva Segovia. The Diocese of Cebu's first bishop was Pedro de Agurto, an Augustinian. As a diocese, Cebú had a very extensive territory which then included the whole of the Visayas, Mindanao and  "more southern islands"; also it extended farther to the Pacific such as the Marianas, Carolines, and Palau.

However it lost territory repeatedly:
 on 1865.05.27 to establish then Diocese of (Santa Isabel de) Jaro (now an Archdiocese)
 on 1902.09.17 to establish Apostolic Prefecture of Mariana Islands
 on 1910.04.10 to establish Diocese of Zamboanga and Diocese of Calbayog
 on 1932.07.15 to establish Diocese of Bacolod

Archdiocese of Cebu 
On April 28, 1934, Pope Pius XI promulgated an apostolic constitution with the incipit Romanorum Pontificum semper separating the dioceses of Cebu, Calbayog, Jaro, Bacolod, Zamboanga and Cagayan de Oro from the ecclesiastical province of Manila. The same constitution elevated the diocese into an archdiocese while placing all the newly separated dioceses under a new ecclesiastical province with Cebu as the new metropolitan see. The last suffragan bishop, Gabriel M. Reyes, was promoted as its first Archbishop. 

On November 8, 1941, it lost territory to establish Diocese of Tagbilaran as its suffragan.

Cebu was visited by Pope John Paul II in 1981. Between November 10, 1985 to March 1, 1986, the archdiocese held its Fourth Diocesan Synod of Cebu at the Seminaryo Mayor de San Carlos. Recently, It hosted the 51st International Eucharistic Congress from January 24 to 31, 2016.

Beginnings of Philippine Christian Tradition

In Cebu the first baptism was made (April 14, 1521), hence, Rajah Humabon and the rest of the natives became the very first Filipino Christians. In the island also was the first Mass in which Filipino converts participated. Also in the territory the first resistance against the Mohammedan advance from the south. The first Philippine Christian feast dedicated to the Sto. Niño was instituted and celebrated there. The first recorded confession and the last rites of an accused inhabitant transpired. The very first temples were erected (the Cebu Metropolitan Cathedral and Basilica del Santo Niño) in the Philippines. The first Christian Marriage transpired with Isabel, the niece of Rajah Tupas and Andres, the Greek caulker of Legazpi, and their children baptized representing the first infant baptisms.

Coat of Arms 
The ecclesiastical arms of the Archdiocese of Cebu was redesigned by a professional Italian Heraldic artist, Sig. Marco Foppoli, as commissioned by the priests-secretaries of the Office of the Archbishop in the first quarter of 2021, with the facilitation and benefaction of Rev. Msgr. Jan Thomas V. Limchua. 

The re-designed coat of arms of the Archdiocese consists of a simple yet traditional shield, which is the most commonly used form in ecclesiastical heraldry. In a chapé (“mantled”) ployé partition, which is formed by two arched lines drawn from the center chief to the sides, the shield itself is divided into two fields: the upper field, in red (gules); and the lower field, in blue (azure). 

The upper field of red represents the Sñr. Sto. Niño de Cebu (Bato Balani sa Gugma, or Magnet of Love), whose very image, which at first was a gift during the First Baptism five hundred (500) years ago, has now become the symbol of Faith in Cebu. 

On this same field are two lions: the first lion, in gold, is emblazoned with the coat of arms of the Kingdom of Castile; while the other, in silver, is emblazoned with the personal coat of arms of Ferdinand Magellan—these two elements were present in the original coat of arms granted to the Archdiocese. Both refer to the Hispanic origin and nascent beginning of Catholicism in Cebu, the Cradle of Christianity in the Philippines. 

These two lions support the stylized monogram of the Holy Name of Jesus inside a stylized image of the sun—symbolizing Christ as the light of the world. It is deliberately placed at the top center of the arm, representing the titular of the Archdiocese. It also recalls the life and ministry of Jesus in the words of St. Paul (Letter to the Philippians): “…he humbled himself, becoming obedient to death, even death on a cross. Because of this, God greatly exalted him and bestowed on him the name that is above every name, that at the name of Jesus every knee should bend, of those in heaven and on earth and under the earth, and every tongue confess that Jesus Christ is Lord, to the glory of God the Father.” (Phil. 2:7-11) 

The field of red also honors the Visayan Proto-Martyr, San Pedro Calungsod. 

The lower field of blue symbolizes Our Lady and her motherly mantle of love and compassion for the Cebuano faithful as also portrayed by the monogram "Auspice Maria" (Under the Protection of Mary) with a gold crown (above), a silver crescent (below), and gold gloriole (around the monogram). This imagery specifically refers to her image and title, Our Lady of Guadalupe de Cebu, through whose intercession, and by God’s grace flowing from above, has saved Cebu from the cholera epidemic of 1902. On 16 July 2006, Virgen de Guadalupe de Cebu was canonically crowned by the authority of Pope Benedict XVI as Patroness of the Archdiocese. 

The upward, arrow tip-like shape of the blue field can be understood as a reminder to the Cebuano faithful that a deep devotion to the Virgin Mary inevitably leads to a greater love for her Divine Son, Our Lord. This is reminiscent of the traditional aphorism, "Ad Jesum per Mariam" (to Jesus, through Mary). 

The entire shield is surmounted by the conventional heraldic elements identifying it to be the coat of arms of an Archdiocese, namely a Miter, and the crossed Crozier and Archiepiscopal Cross. 

Written on a scroll, below the arms, is the Motto of the Archdiocese: “Sanctum Nomen Eius,” which means “Holy is His Name,” taken from Mary’s Magnificat (Luke 1:49).

Approbations

Cebu's Basilica Minore del Sto. Niño: Mother and Head of All Churches 
In the Apostolic Letter Ut Clarificetur, on the conferring the titles and privileges of the basilica, Pope Paul VI in 1965 described the Cebu's now Basilica del Santo Niño as the "Mother and Head of all Churches in the Philippines" (mater et caput... omnium ecclesiarum Insularum Philippinarum). The same Paul VI also named the basilica the "symbol of the birth and growth of Christianity in the Philippines."

Seat of Philippine Christianity
Pope John Paul II, in his Homily for Families in Cebu (February 19, 1981), called the island as the birthplace of the faith:

Finding myself in this important city known as the cradle of Christianity in the Philippines, I want to express my deep joy and profound thanksgiving to the Lord of history. The thought that for 450 years the light of the Gospel has shone with undimmed brightness in this land and on its people is cause for great rejoicing.

Ordinaries

Prelates of Cebu 
Fray Andrés de Urdaneta, O.S.A † (April 1565 - June 1565), considered as first prelate of the Philippines.
Fray Diego de Herrera, O.S.A † (June 1565 - 1569)
Fray Martín de Rada, O.S.A † (1569 - 1572)
Fray Alfonso Jimenez, O.S.A † (1575 - 1577)

Suffragan Bishops of Cebu
 Pedro de Agurto, O.S.A † (30 August 1595 Appointed - 14 Oct 1608 Died)
 Pedro de Arce, O.S.A. † (17 Sep 1612 Appointed - 16 Oct 1645 Died)
 Father Juan Velez † (26 Jan 1660 bishop elect - 1662 Died)
 Juan López † (23 April 1663 Appointed - 14 Nov 1672), later Metropolitan Archbishop of Manila (Philippines) (1672.11.14 – death 1674.02.12)
 Diego de Aguilar, O.P. † (16 Nov 1676 Appointed - 1 Oct 1692 Died)
 Miguel Bayot, O.F.M. † (13 May 1697 Appointed - 28 Aug 1700 Died)
 Pedro Sanz de la Vega y Landaverde, O. de M. † (26 Jan 1705 Appointed - 17 Dec 1717 Died)
 Apostolic Administrator Sebastián Foronda, O.S.A. † (2 March 1722 Appointed - 20 May 1728 Died)
 Manuel de Ocio y Campo † (20 Jan 1734 Appointed - 21 July 1737 Died)
 Protacio Cabezas † (29 Aug 1740 Appointed - 3 Feb 1753 Died)
 Miguel Lino de Ezpeleta † (18 July 1757 Appointed - 1771 Died)
 Mateo Joaquin Rubio de Arevalo † (13 Nov 1775 Appointed - 1788 Died)
 Ignacio de Salamanca † (24 Sep 1792 Appointed - Feb 1802 Died)
 Joaquín Encabo de la Virgen de Sopetrán, O.A.R. † (20 Aug 1804 Appointed - 8 Nov 1818 Died)
 Francisco Genovés, O.P. † (21 March 1825 Appointed - 1 Aug 1827 Died)
 Santos Gómez Marañón, O.S.A. † (28 Sep 1829 Appointed - 23 Oct 1840 Died)
 Romualdo Jimeno Ballesteros, O.P. † (19 Jan 1846 Appointed - 17 March 1872 Died); previously Titular Bishop of Ruspæ (1839.08.02 – 1846.01.19) & Coadjutor Apostolic Vicar of Eastern Tonking (Vietnam) (1839.08.02 – 1845.06.20), Coadjutor Bishop of Manila (Philippines) (1845.06.20 – 1846.01.19)
 Benito Romero, O.F.M. † (28 Jan 1876 Appointed - 4 Nov 1885 Died)
 Martín García y Alcocer, O.F.M. † (7 June 1886 Appointed - 30 July 1904 Resigned); emeritate as Titular Archbishop of Bostra (1904.07.30 – 1926.05.20)
 Thomas A. Hendrick † (17 July 1903 Appointed - 29 Nov 1909 Died)
 Juan Bautista Gorordo † (2 April 1910 Appointed - 19 June 1931 Resigned), succeeded ad former Titular Bishop of Nilopolis (1909.04.29 – 1910.04.02) & Auxiliary Bishop of Cebu (1909.04.29 – 1910.04.02); emeritate as Titular Bishop of Tacapæ (1931.06.19 – 1934.12.20)
 Gabriel M. Reyes † (29 July 1932 Appointed - 1934.04.28 see below)

Metropolitan Archbishops of Cebu

Auxiliary Bishops

Diocesan Seminaries
 Pope John XXIII Seminary, Pope John Paul II Avenue, Barangay Luz, Cebu City 
Rector: Rev. Fr. Allan Delima
 San Carlos Seminary College, Pope John Paul II Avenue, Barangay Luz, Cebu City 
Rector: Rev. Msgr. Joseph Tan P.C., S.T.L.
 Seminario Mayor de San Carlos, Pope John Paul II Avenue, Barangay Luz, Cebu City 
Rector: Rev. Msgr. Vicente Rey M. Penagunda, P.C., V.G.
 Spiritual Pastoral Formation Year House, Archbishop's Residence Compound, D. Jakosalem St., Cebu City 
Director: Rev. Fr. Alvin Raypan

Archdiocesan Calendar
The Calendar of the Archdiocese of Cebu is based on the General Roman Calendar and the Philippine Standard Calendar. Below are the following additions and changes to the calendar.

 3 January - Most Holy Name of Jesus, titular of the Archdiocese - Solemnity
 Third Sunday of January: Santo Niño de Cebú - Solemnity
 28 January - Dedication of the Cebu Metropolitan Cathedral as an Archdiocesan Cathedral - Feast (Solemnity in the Cathedral itself)
 29 January - Saint Thomas Aquinas, priest and doctor of the Church - Memorial
 11 February - Our Lady, Health of the Sick - Optional Memorial
 1 April - Saint Pedro Calungsod, Cebuano martyr and Secondary Patron of the Archdiocese- Feast
 28 April - Saint Vitalis of Milan, martyr and Titular of the Metropolitan Cathedral - Memorial (Solemnity in the Cathedral itself)
 15 May - Saint Isidore the Laborer - Memorial
 30 May - Saint Ferdinand III of Castile, king - Optional Memorial
 2 August - Our Lady of the Angels of Portiuncula - Optional Memorial
 16 August - Saint Roch - Memorial
 19 August - Saint Ezechiel Moreno, bishop - Memorial
 22 August - Our Lady, Queen of the Visayas, Principal Patroness of the Visayas Region - Feast
 10 September - Saint Nicholas of Tolentino, priest - Optional Memorial
 22 September - Saint Thomas of Villanova (Sto. Tomas de Villanueva), bishop - Memorial
 24 September - Saints Cosmas and Damian, martyrs or Saint Wenceslaus, king martyrs- Optional Memorial
 25 September - Saint Vincent de Paul, priest - Memorial
 26 September - Saint Paul VI, pope (Elevated the Santo Niño Church into a Minor Basilica Status) - Memorial (Feast in the Basilica itself)
 27 September - Commemoration of the Servant of God Teofilo Camomot, Cebu's Former Auxiliary Bishop
 28 September - Saint Lorenzo Ruiz and Companions, martyrs - Memorial
 18 November - Dedication of the Cebu Metropolitan Cathedral as a Diocesan Cathedral - Feast (Solemnity in the Cathedral itself)
 12 December - Our Lady of Guadalupe, Principal Patroness of the Archdiocese - Solemnity

See also

 Catholic Church in the Philippines
 Archdiocese of Manila
 Archdiocese of Caceres
 Diocese of Talibon
 List of the Catholic dioceses of the Philippines
 Cebu Catholic Television Network

References 

Notes

Sources and external links
 Official website
 GCatholic with incumbent bio links
 Catholic Encyclopedia: Cebu
 Archdiocese of Cebu on the Catholic Bishops Conference of the Philippines website
 Archdiocese of Cebu [www.catholic-hierarchy.org]
 Redesigned Coat of Arms

Archdiocese of Cebu
Religious organizations established in the 1590s
Roman Catholic dioceses in the Philippines
Archdiocese
Roman Catholic dioceses established in the 16th century
Religion in Cebu
Cebu City